Reilly may refer to:

Places
Reilly, Oise, commune in France
Reilly, California, in Inyo County
Reilly Township, Schuylkill County, Pennsylvania
Reilly, County Fermanagh, a townland in County Fermanagh, Northern Ireland

Other
Reilly (surname)
Reilly (band), an American Christian folk rock band
Reilly, Ace of Spies, a 1983 British television series
Reilly's Law of Retail Gravitation, a principle of economics

See also
Mary Reilly (disambiguation)
O'Reilly (disambiguation)
The Life of Riley (disambiguation)